The Lagos Islanders are a Nigerian basketball club based in Lagos, founded in 1984. The franchise was co-owned by the late music artist Sound Sultan since 2014. They play their home games at the Rowe Park Sports Centre in the Yaba area.

In 2016, the Islanders played in the private African Basketball League (ABL). Because the Nigerian Basketball Federation (NBBF) did not recognise this league, they were suspended from domestic leagues. The ban was lifted in 2019.

Honours
Nigerian Premier League
Winners (5): 1997, 1998, 1999, 2000, 2001
FIBA Africa Club Champions Cup

 Third place (1): 2000

References

Basketball teams in Nigeria
Basketball teams established in 1984